Marshall is a city in Saline County, Missouri, United States. The population was 13,065 at the 2010 census. It is the county seat of Saline County.  The Marshall Micropolitan Statistical Area consists of Saline County. It is home to Missouri Valley College.

History

Sixty-five acres of land for the city of Marshall was donated by Jeremiah O’Dell, deeded on April 13, 1839. It was named for the United States Supreme Court Chief Justice, John Marshall, when chosen for the county seat. After the first two courthouses in Marshall were lost to fires, the Saline County Courthouse was constructed in January 1882; it was placed on the National Register of Historic Places in 1977. The courthouse is an enduring landmark in the center of the Marshall Square, and a legacy of Nineteenth-Century architecture.

The Nicholas-Beazley Airplane Company was an American aircraft manufacturer headquartered in Marshall in the 1920s and 1930s. At its peak, the company produced as many as one aircraft per day. In 1937, production of aircraft ceased, due to economic pressures from the Great Depression. Today, the Nicholas Beazley Aviation Museum is located at the Marshall Airport, with artifacts of interest from aviation history. ConAgra Foods owns the property of the old Nicholas-Beazley Airplane Company factory building, located right off the Marshall square; the factory building was torn down in the summer of 2015 to expand the ConAgra plant.

Marshall is rich in music history. Marshall is the home of Bob James, the acclaimed jazz musician; the Foothills Fest Music Festival; The Marshall Municipal Band; and, notably, the Marshall Philharmonic Orchestra. The Orchestra performs every year for the public, free of charge, and has been featured in the Los Angeles Times in 2006 and on NBC's American Almanac in December 1985, among other media outlets. The Philharmonic Orchestra has been performing for 52 years and counting. The Municipal Band has been performing for nearly 100 years and usually performs on the Courthouse lawn every Thursday evening during the summer months, filling the town square with music.

Marshall is also home to Jim the Wonder Dog. Jim earned his reputation as a 'wonder dog' during the 1930s, puzzling psychologists from both Washington University in St. Louis and University of Missouri. Dr. A. J. Durant, director of the School of Veterinary Medicine, tested Jim's abilities in a public demonstration. He concluded that Jim, "possessed an occult power that might never come again to a dog in many generations." Jim seemed to have the ability to guess the sex of an unborn baby and answer to orders in many different languages even though his owner, Sam Van Arsdale, spoke only English. Jim the Wonder Dog picked the winner of the Kentucky Derby seven years in a row, and also predicted the Yankees' victory in the 1936 World Series. A joint session of the Missouri Legislature was called in order to witness the talents of Jim. He died March 18, 1937.

During the Civil War, Marshall was garrisoned by Union Troops. Although Marshall was strategically unimportant, the town was the victim of two Confederate raids and the site of the October 13, 1863 Battle of Marshall, the climax of Colonel J. O. Shelby's 1863 "Great Raid". Confronted by a larger force of 1,800 Federal troops and Missouri State Militia, Shelby broke through, divided his command and withdrew from Missouri. d.<ref>McLachlan, Sean. (2011) Ride Around Missouri; Shelby's Great Raid 1863". Osprey Publishing. pp. 52-67</ref>

Missouri Valley College was founded in Marshall in 1889. The history of Missouri Valley College began during a conference at Sarcoxie, Missouri, on October 27, 1874, where the representatives of the several Presbyterian synods in the state of Missouri met to discuss founding the school. The school was affiliated with the Cumberland Presbyterian Church for a long period.

The college's original building, Baity Hall, was built in 1889, the year of the college's founding, and is listed on the National Register of Historic Places. The Victorian Era building is notable for its beautiful wooden staircase, vaulted wooden ceilings, and stained glass windows. Missouri Valley College is a private, four-year liberal arts college affiliated with the Presbyterian Church (USA). The 150-acre (60.7 ha) campus is found within the city limits of Marshall. The college supports 27 academic majors and an enrollment close to 1,800 students. Missouri Valley College is accredited by the Higher Learning Commission, a Commission of the North Central Association of Colleges and Schools.

In addition to Baity Hall, the Chicago and Alton Depot, First Presbyterian Church, Fitzgibbon Hospital, Free Will Baptist Church of Pennytown, Mt. Carmel Historic District, Saline County Courthouse, Utz Site, Van Meter State Park Combination Building, and Van Meter State Park Shelter Building are listed on the National Register of Historic Places.

Geography

Climate
Marshall has a hot-summer humid continental climate (Köppen: Dfa).

Demographics

2010 census
As of the census of 2010, there were 13,065 people, 4,741 households, and 2,946 families living in the city. The racial makeup of the city was 79.2% White, 7.8% African American, 0.4% Native American, 0.7% Asian, 1.2% Pacific Islander, 7.7% from other races, and 3.0% from two or more races. Hispanic or Latino of any race were 13.2% of the population.

There were 4,741 households, of which 33.6% had children under the age of 18 living with them, 42.4% were married couples living together, 14.1% had a female householder with no husband present, 5.6% had a male householder with no wife present, and 37.9% were non-families. 30.5% of all households were made up of individuals, and 14.1% had someone living alone who was 65 years of age or older. The average household size was 2.49 and the average family size was 3.07.

The median age in the city was 32.9 years. 23.8% of residents were under the age of 18; 15.8% were between the ages of 18 and 24; 23.5% were from 25 to 44; 22.8% were from 45 to 64; and 14.2% were 65 years of age or older. The gender makeup of the city was 49.2% male and 50.8% female.

2000 census
As of the 2000 census, with a population of 12,433, showed 4,732 households, and 2,985 families living in the city. The population density was 1,225.4 people per square mile (472.9/km2). There were 5,127 housing units at an average density of 505.3 per square mile (195.0/km2). The racial makeup of the city was 86.05% White, 7.40% African American, 0.43% Native American, 0.39% Asian, 0.34% Pacific Islander, 3.46% from other races, and 1.94% from two or more races. Hispanic or Latino of any race were 7.17% of the population.

There were 4,732 households, out of which 30.7% had children under the age of 18 living with them, 45.8% were married couples living together, 12.9% had a female householder with no husband present, and 36.9% were non-families. 31.1% of all households were made up of individuals, and 15.4% had someone living alone who was 65 years of age or older. The average household size was 2.42 and the average family size was 3.00.

In the city, the population was spread out, with 24.7% under the age of 18, 13.0% from 18 to 24, 25.3% from 25 to 44, 21.8% from 45 to 64, and 15.3% who were 65 years of age or older. The median age was 36 years. For every 100 females, there were 95.3 males. For every 100 females age 18 and over, there were 93.5 males.

The median income for a household in the city was $31,649, and the median income for a family was $36,686. Males had a median income of $26,556 versus $19,688 for females. The per capita income for the city was $16,646. About 12.5% of families and 15.0% of the population were below the poverty line, including 23.6% of those under age 18 and 5.1% of those age 65 or over.

 Censorship debate 
In October 2006, a resident of Marshall attempted to have the graphic novels Fun Home, by Alison Bechdel, and Blankets, by Craig Thompson, removed from the Marshall Public Library.  Supporters of the books' removal characterized them as "pornography" and expressed concern that they would be read by children. Marshall Public Library Director Amy Crump defended the books as having been well-reviewed in "reputable, professional book review journals," and characterized the removal attempt as a step towards "the slippery slope of censorship". On October 11, 2006, the Marshall Public Library Board of Trustees appointed a committee to create a materials selection policy, and removed Fun Home and Blankets from circulation until the new policy was approved. On March 14, 2007, the board voted to return both Fun Home and Blankets'' to the library's shelves.

Education
The Marshall Public School District serves Marshall in K-12 education. Missouri Valley College is located in Marshall.

Marshall has a lending library, the Marshall Public Library.

Notable people
Walt Housman, American football player
Bob James, jazz musician
Noble Johnson, actor
Chelsea Liu, figure skater (pairs)
Robert Pearson McChesney, artist
 Doc Quigg, journalist
Twila Tanner, contestant on Survivor: Vanuatu

Notable animal
Jim the Wonder Dog - Noted hunting dog with a park in town named for him.

See also
Book censorship in the United States
Impact of the 2019–20 coronavirus pandemic on the meat industry in the United States

References

External links

 Historic maps of Marshall in the Sanborn Maps of Missouri Collection at the University of Missouri

Cities in Saline County, Missouri
Cities in Missouri
County seats in Missouri